William Hamilton was Archdeacon of Armagh from 1700 to 1730.

Hewetson was  born in Caledon, County Tyrone and educated at Trinity College, Dublin and Wadham College, Oxford.    His brother  was  Archdeacon of Raphoe for 64 years.

Notes

17th-century Irish Anglican priests
18th-century Irish Anglican priests
Archdeacons of Armagh
Alumni of Trinity College Dublin
People from County Tyrone